Slava is a given name in Slavic countries.

Slava is a common nickname for masculine Slavic names ending with "-slav", e.g. Vyacheslav, Stanislav, Yaroslav, Sviatoslav, Rostislav, Mstislav or feminine Slavic names ending with "-slava", e.g. Miroslava, Yaroslava. Notable people whose given name has this etymology include:

 Desi Slava (born 1979), Bulgarian musician (Desislava)
 Slava (singer) (born 1980), Russian singer (Anastasia)
 Slava Bykov (born 1960), Russian ice hockey player and coach (Vyacheslav)
 Slava Fetisov (born 1958), Russian ice hockey player (Viacheslav)
 Slava Frolova (born 1976), Ukrainian television presenter (Vyacheslava)
 Slava Gerovitch (born 1963), American historian of Russian science (Vyacheslav)
 Slava Kozlov (born 1972), Russian ice hockey player (Vyacheslav)
 Slava KPSS (born 1990), Russian musician (Vyacheslav)
 Slava Kravtsov (born 1987), Ukrainian basketball player (Viacheslav)
 Slava Kurilov (1936–1998) Soviet, Canadian and Israeli oceanographer (Stanislav)
 Slava Medvedenko (born 1979), Ukrainian basketball player (Stanislav)
 Slava Mogutin (born 1974), New York-based Russian artist and author (Yaroslav)
 Slava Polunin (born 1950), Russian performance artist (Vyacheslav)
 Slava Rychkov (born 1975), Russian-Italian-French physicist and mathematician (Vyacheslav)
 Slava Stetsko (1920–2003), Ukrainian politician and World War II veteran (Yaroslava)
 Slava Tsukerman (born 1940), Russian Jewish film director (Vladislav)
 Slava Turyshev, Russian physicist working in the US (Vyacheslav)
 Slava Vakarchuk (born 1975), Ukrainian musician, politician and activist (Svyatoslav)
 Slava Voynov (born 1990), Russian ice hockey player (Vyacheslav)
 Slava Zaitsev (born 1938), Russian artist (Vyacheslav)

Slava is also a full given name, masculine and feminine:

 Slava Amiragov (1926–1990), Russian rower
 Slava Grigoryan (born 1976), Australian musician
 Slava Marlow (born 1999), Russian musician
 Slava Metreveli (1936–1998), Georgian football player and manager
 Slava Raškaj (1877–1906), Croatian painter

See also
 Slavica, feminine diminutive form
 Slaven (given name), Slavko, Slaviša

Unisex given names
Slavic given names
Russian masculine given names
Croatian feminine given names
Ukrainian masculine given names
Bulgarian feminine given names